Nightstar (Mar'i Grayson) is a fictional character in DC Comics, the daughter of Starfire and Dick Grayson/Nightwing in an alternate universe. She serves as a member of Batman's team Outsiders.

Fictional character biography

Kingdom Come
Nightstar first appears in Kingdom Come #1 (May 1996) when she is seen in a street battle. Nightstar's mother Starfire Koriand'r has died from a circulatory illness. Most of the supervillains of the world have been eliminated so the new generation of heroes "fight simply to fight, their only foes each other". Nightstar and others cause destruction in the neighbourhood, getting innocents caught in the crossfire. They only pause to learn of a major disaster in the state of Kansas in which a similar battle has led to the deaths of one million people.

Superman, who has been in self-imposed exile, returns to reform the Justice League and restore order. Among his recruits is Nightstar's father Dick Grayson, who adopts the identity of Red Robin. Nightstar is at first very dismissive of this move.

She is next seen in conversation with Avia, daughter of Mister Miracle and Big Barda in an underground bar. Superman appears and makes a powerful recruitment speech for the Justice League. Nightstar is impressed but, unlike Avia, she does not fall in with Superman. Instead, she throws in with Batman, who, through Dick Grayson, is her adopted grandfather, as do many other progeny of League members, including the daughters of Speedy, Aqualad and Flash, and the son of Donna Troy.

Batman, who no longer uses the cover of his alter-ego Bruce Wayne, has formed an alliance with Lex Luthor's Mankind Liberation Front in order to counter what they see as the overbearing might of the Justice League. During a meeting between their groups, Nightstar encounters Ibn Al Xu'ffasch, Batman's son and the heir to the Dark Knight's enemy Ra's al Ghul. The moment they meet, Nightstar and Ibn have an undisguised attraction for one another.

Batman's real agenda, however, is to expose Luthor and his schemes to cause more chaos in the world. Just as Luthor is about to unleash this chaos, Batman and his followers overpower him and his associates—with the notable exception of Ibn, who is later seen arm in arm with Nightstar.

The League has built a special prison to hold rebellious superhumans, but the prison is breached and an all-out battle ensues between the prisoners and the Leaguers. Batman's Outsiders join in the fight, during which Red Robin (Richard Grayson) is seriously injured by an enemy called 666. Nightstar, who has been fighting Green Lantern, gasps in horror as this happens, screams in agony as she cradles her father's bloodied face, and then flies him off to safety.

Wayne Manor is later converted into a hospital where the victims from the battle are treated. Nightstar oversees a reconciliation between her father and grandfather.

Justice Society of America (vol. 3) #22 (2009) reveals that she would eventually marry Ibn Al Xu'ffasch and have a daughter and son.

The Kingdom
In The Kingdom, the miniseries that serves as a sequel to Kingdom Come, her name is revealed to be Mar'i. Mary is the name of her paternal grandmother, Mary Loyd Grayson. She is also shown to be a leader of her generation, an active Titan whom others look to for inspiration and solution, a role once filled by her father Richard Grayson.

During the series and related events, Nightstar becomes part of a small super-team investigating reality disturbances in Planet Krypton, a restaurant owned by Booster Gold. This leads to a battle with Gog and the eventual discovery of Hypertime.

In The Kingdom: Nightstar, it is revealed that she has an interest in botany, a fear of death, and works with security at Green Lantern Alan Scott's space station The Green.

Powers and abilities
Like her mother, Nightstar is capable of atmospheric flight, has super-strength, super speed, endurance and can absorb star energy to project in powerful bursts. Her eyes are green and pupilless. Being the daughter of a human and an alien, she is a hybrid.

Relationships with other heroes
Friends include Olivia Queen (Black Canary III, daughter of Dinah Lance and Oliver Queen), Avia (daughter of Mister Miracle and Big Barda), and Manotaur.

In other media
In the Titans season 3 episode "Prodigal", Dick has a vision in which he sees a small girl with a resemblance to the show's version of Starfire. The girl calls him "Daddy" and hands him a balloon. Played by Lillian Monize, the child is only credited as "Dick's Little Girl".

References

Comics characters introduced in 1996
DC Comics characters with superhuman strength
DC Comics characters who can move at superhuman speeds
DC Comics female superheroes 
DC Comics hybrids
Fictional extraterrestrial–human hybrids in comics
Fictional characters with absorption or parasitic abilities
Fictional characters with energy-manipulation abilities
Fictional characters with fire or heat abilities
Fictional characters with nuclear or radiation abilities
Fictional characters with post-traumatic stress disorder
Characters created by Mark Waid
Characters created by Alex Ross
Dick Grayson
Fictional characters from parallel universes